Michael Lehan (born November 25, 1979) is a former American football cornerback in the National Football League. He was drafted by the Cleveland Browns in the fifth round of the 2003 NFL Draft. He played college football at Minnesota.

Lehan also played for the Miami Dolphins.

As of the 2018-2019 school year, Lehan is the principal for Osseo Senior High School.

Professional career

He was originally a fifth-round draft choice (152nd overall) by the Cleveland Browns in 2003. He appeared in 32 games for the Browns between 2003–2005, but was waived by Cleveland on February 23, 2006.

Lehan signed with the Dolphins as a free agent on May 12, 2006 after attending the team’s rookie mini-camp from May 5–7 on a tryout basis. On December 16, 2007, he made the first interception of his NFL career, picking-off Baltimore Ravens quarterback Kyle Boller.

Lehan was signed by the Saints on December 17, 2008 when Reggie Bush went on injured reserve.

References

External links
New Orleans Saints bio

1979 births
Living people
People from Hopkins, Minnesota
American football cornerbacks
Minnesota Golden Gophers football players
Cleveland Browns players
Miami Dolphins players
New Orleans Saints players
Players of American football from Minnesota
Sportspeople from the Minneapolis–Saint Paul metropolitan area
Hopkins High School alumni